FAO, or the Food and Agriculture Organization, is an agency of the United Nations.

FAO may also refer to:

Places
Fao, Iraq
Fao Peninsula
Fão, Portugal
Faro Airport, in Portugal, airport code FAO

Military and insurgents
Al-Fao, an Iraqi artillery system
Western Armed Forces, a Chadian insurgent group
 Fusil ametrallador Oviedo, a Spanish light machine gun

Professions
Flight Activities Officer, a NASA flight controller
Foreign area officer of the United States Armed Forces

Other uses
Fao (god), a god of Niue
Fao festival, in Ghana
FAO Schwarz, an American toy retailer
Faroese language, language code Fao
Football Association of Odisha, in India